The Lufthansa Innovation Hub in Berlin, Germany is the "digital innovation" unit of the global aviation conglomerate Lufthansa Group. The business is a wholly owned subsidiary of Deutsche Lufthansa AG and manages the interests of the Lufthansa Group hub airlines (Lufthansa, SWISS, Austrian Airlines), the Low-cost carrier Eurowings, the frequent flyer program Miles & More and other subsidiaries of the group.
The business, which is led by serial entrepreneur Gleb Tritus and Christian Langer, Chief Digital Officer of Lufthansa Group, brings together at its location in Berlin employees of the airline's Frankfurt am Main headquarters with talent of the German startup ecosystem.

History
The Lufthansa Innovation Hub was created as a result of the Lufthansa Group's strategic initiative “7to1”, which was launched in July 2014. As part of this program, Lufthansa Group announced its intention to invest over 500 million Euro in innovations by 2020, including in the field of “innovation & digitization”.

Awards
In June 2017, the Lufthansa Innovation Hub was awarded the title of “Germany’s Best Digital Lab” by the German business magazine Capital. Furthermore, the Lufthansa Open API, which is a product of the Lufthansa Innovation Hub, was named a “Digital Leader” with an award from the IDG Publishing Group in June 2017. The digital travel assistant “Mission Control” and “AirlineCheckins.com), which were also developed by the Lufthansa Innovation Hub, were both named “Corporate Startup of the Year“ in 2016 and 2017.

Products
The Lufthansa Innovation Hub developed a variety of travel-focused smartphone applications and web services launched in Germany, Austria, Switzerland, Great Britain and South Korea, resulting in a five-figure number of new customers for Lufthansa Group.
Among others, the “Time2Gate” app, which is designed to show passengers the fastest way to their gate, was included in the company's portfolio as well as the AirlineCheckins.com. The Lufthansa Open API established an open programming interface that allows startups and other third parties to integrate Lufthansa Group data in their own applications. The roadmap includes the option for flight bookings to be made via the interface as well 
Acting on behalf of the Lufthansa Group Airline, Eurowings, the Lufthansa Innovation Hub developed a “ten-ticket-pass for flying” using a model that is widespread in local public transportation networks.
The Lufthansa Innovation Hub also works with the American startup accelerator Plug and Play Tech Center to seek new strategic partners in Silicon Valley.

Advisory board
The Lufthansa Innovation Hub maintains an Advisory Board which brings together business managers with online futurists such as Jeff Jarvis, the entrepreneur, Dr. Stefan Glaenzer, and  Erica Dhawan.

See also
 Lufthansa
 Eurowings
 Miles & More

References 

Lufthansa
German companies established in 2015
Companies based in Berlin
Technology companies of Germany
Technology companies established in 2015